Lindsey White (1980) is a visual artist working across many disciplines including photography, video, sculpture, and book making. Her work has been described as "reveling in lighthearted gags and simple gestures to create an experience that is all the more satisfying for the puzzles it contains."

Early life and education 

White was born in 1980 in Tulsa, Oklahoma. She received her Bachelor of Fine Arts from Pacific Northwest College of Art in Portland, Oregon and her Master of Fine Arts from the California College of Art in San Francisco, California.

Work 

Her solo exhibitions include 2017 SFMOMA SECA Award Exhibition at the San Francisco Museum of Modern Art, In That Case: Havruta in Contemporary Art at the Contemporary Jewish Museum, San Francisco, CA. "Through video, photography, and sculpture, White models a type of site gag index, working with the language of magic and comedy to challenge ordinary perceptions by presenting the unexpected and impossible. Like a good joke, her work pits cartoonish occurrence against the mundane physicality of everyday life." White's work is fictionalizing an awkward stage moment, forming a joke in its own right. She has exhibited at places such as Museum Bärengasse, Switzerland; Bolinas Art Museum, Bolinas, California; Marylhurst Art Gym, Portland, Oregon; San Francisco International Airport Museum, San Francisco, California; diRosa, Napa Valley, California; ACME., Los Angeles, California; San Francisco Arts Commission, San Francisco, California; and Aurora Picture Show, Houston, Texas.

Collaborators 

Additionally, she is a part of a collaborative project, Will Brown (with David Kasprzak and Jordan Stein) who reimagines the roles of artist and curator through an inventive upending of traditional exhibition formats. The collective often mines unexpected or forgotten histories that exist within artistic and cultural spheres. The practice has been described as meta-curating. "This trio of artist-curators is making exhibitions and events out of a San Francisco storefront that are smart, weird and historical, with a great sense of humor. Their latest installation — inspired by a true story involving the fate of painter Kazimir Malevich's burial site in Moscow — transformed the space into a luxury Russian condominium." Will Brown has realized projects with Wattis Institute, Kadist Foundation, Ulrich Museum of Art, di Rosa, Headlands Center of the Arts, and in 2015 had a solo MATRIX exhibition at the Berkeley Museum of Art/Pacific Film Archive. Will Brown was awarded a Creative Fund Grant in collaboration with the San Francisco Art Institute in 2015.

Publications 

 Cotton, Charlotte (2015). Photography is Magic. Aperture. 
 White, Lindsey. "The American Road Trip." The Photographer's Playbook, Ed. Jason Fulford and Gregory Halpern, Aperture, 2014

Teaching 

White is currently an Assistant Professor of Photography at the San Francisco Art Institute.

References

External links 

 

1980 births
Living people
American women photographers
Artists from San Francisco
California College of the Arts alumni
San Francisco Art Institute faculty
American women academics
21st-century American women